The 2019 FIBA Women's Asia Cup was the first step for the qualification for FIBA Asia and FIBA Oceania for the women's basketball tournament at the 2020 Summer Olympics in Tokyo, Japan. The tournament was held from 24 to 29 September 2019 in Bangalore, India.

Japan won their fifth overall and fourth consecutive title after defeating China in the final.

Venue

Qualified teams
Host nation/Division B winner at the 2017 FIBA Women's Asia Cup:

Division A Top 7 teams at the 2017 FIBA Women's Asia Cup:

Competition format
For Division A, during the Group phase, eight participating teams were divided into two groups of four teams each. Each team played all the other teams in its own group (a total of three games for each team).

The top teams in each group automatically qualified to the semi-finals, while the next two teams qualified to the quarter-finals, where the second placed team of one group played the third placed team of the other group for a spot in the semi-finals.

Meanwhile, the bottom teams in each group played the seventh place classification game. The eighth placed team of Division A was supposed to be relegated down to Division B of 2021 FIBA Women's Asia Cup, while the remaining teams in Division A advanced to play in the FIBA Pre-Qualifying Olympic Tournament alongside the Division B winner. However, the Division B was not held due to no country willing to host the tournament and India was given a berth in the Olympic pre-qualifiers. India also remained in Division A of the 2021 FIBA Women's Asia Cup.

Squads

Each team consisted of 12 players which had to be confirmed by FIBA before 23 September.

Preliminary round
All times are local (UTC+05:30)

Group A

Group B

Knockout round

Bracket

Playoffs

Semifinals

Seventh place game

Fifth place game

Third place game

Final

Final standing

Statistics and awards

Statistical leaders

Points

Rebounds

Assists

Blocks

Steals

Awards
The all star-teams and MVP was announced on 29 September 2019.

References

External links
Official website

 
2019 in women's basketball
Bask
women
2019
September 2019 sports events in India
International women's basketball competitions hosted by India